The Centenary Building is a building at the University of Salford in Greater Manchester, England. It was completed in December 1995 and opened in 1996 and was designed by the architect Stephen Hodder.

The building won the RIBA Award and Stirling Prize in 1996 and the Civic Trust Award in 1997.

Site and brief
The site is situated on the edge of the city of Manchester and lies within the campus of the University of Salford.

The brief for the building came from the predecessor of the University of Salford towards the end of 1994 and demanded a building which was a "fusion of design and technology" to house the Spatial, Graphic and Industrial Design Department of the university.

Hodder had 11 weeks to finish the design stage and begin development on site in order to ensure the EU grant was eligible.

Architecture
The building consists of two separate glazed structures set as a frame to an informal galleried atrium.

The service towers and studio and seminar accommodation are housed within a four-storey orthogonal block on the "City side" of the development.

The tutorial accommodation and technology suites are situated in a free-form three-storey block newly defined courtyard. The connection between the two blocks is a raised street within which all horizontal circulation is contained in galleries.

In this way street life becomes an aspect of the life of the building; common areas, adjoining offices and studios engage with the street the animate the building and imbue it with a sense of purpose.

Working details of escape stair is enclosed in glass block screen. Other materials include stainless steel cladding and concrete.

Accommodation includes seminar rooms, video-editing suites, lecture halls.

The end result is a building which looks strikingly modern, but which has significant usability problems. Because the design features visible movement of people, the environment is noisy and the full-height glass walls to offices and study spaces offers little in the way of privacy, A large number of rooms have no direct external windows, relying instead on borrowed light from the central atrium. The subsequent lack of ventilation and reliance on fluorescent lighting for the whole of the day is not conducive to good health. Outside of rooms, all spaces are designed for transit and thus there are no informal 'social' areas for people to gather and talk. On a more mundane level, there are no kitchen areas and the only taps delivering drinking water are situated in the toilets. None of the toilets have external windows, and thus are usually less than pleasant spaces to visit. Central heating is under-specified which, when coupled with the already mentioned windows and ventilation issues, leaves the building cold in Winter and unbearably hot in Summer.

Engineering
The construction of the building was completed relatively speedily in comparison to other similar buildings in Britain and to a built to a tight financial budget in order that it could take advantage of EU grant funding.

References

External links
 Hodder's landmark for Salford

Buildings and structures completed in 1995
Buildings and structures in Salford
University of Salford
Recipients of Civic Trust Awards